Mavelikkara Krishnankutty Nair (11 October 1920 – 13 January 1988) was a Carnatic Mridangam player. He received his training from Alleppey Venkappan Pillai and Veechur Krishna Iyer. He considered Palani Subramaniam Pillai as his 'Manasa Guru'. He received the Padma Shri from the President of India. He received the Kerala Sangeetha Nataka Akademi Award in 1971 and the Kerala Sangeetha Nataka Akademi Fellowship in 1980. Krishnankutty Nair was also an artiste for All India Radio in Trivandrum.

References

External links
 ‘I believe in healthy competition’ 

Mridangam players
People from Kerala
1920 births
1988 deaths
20th-century drummers
Recipients of the Padma Shri in arts
Recipients of the Kerala Sangeetha Nataka Akademi Fellowship
Recipients of the Kerala Sangeetha Nataka Akademi Award